Michael the Deacon was a deacon in the Ethiopian Orthodox Church in the 16th century A.D.

In 1534, Michael the Deacon travelled to Wittenberg and met with Martin Luther, a leader in the Reformation. During the meeting, the two compared the Lutheran Mass with that used by the Ethiopian Orthodox Church and found that they were in agreement with one another. Michael the Deacon also affirmed Luther's Articles of the Christian Faith as a "good creed". As such, Luther invited the Ethiopian Orthodox Church to full fellowship.

References 

Deacons
Ethiopian Orthodox Tewahedo Church
History of Lutheranism